Tendō or tendo can refer to:

Places
 , a city in Japan
 , a feudal domain in Edo period Japan, located in modern-day Yamagata Prefecture
 Tendō Station, a train station in Tendō

Japanese family name

People
 Tendō clan, a Japanese kin group in Dewa Province during the Sengoku and Edo periods

Fictional characters
 Characters from Japanese Manga series Ranma 1/2
 Akane Tendo (天道)
 Kasumi Tendo
 Nabiki Tendo
 Soun Tendo
 Gai Tendo of 1999 video game Buriki-One
 Jyuka Tendou (Tendō Juka), a character from Kamen Rider Kabuto
 Mayumi Tendo (Tendō Mayumi, 天堂) of Japanese Manga series Battle Royale
 Rushuna Tendou (Tendō Rushuna), a character from Grenadier - The Senshi of Smiles
 Souji Tendou (Tendō Sōji), a character from Kamen Rider Kabuto
 Tendo Choi of 2013 science fiction action film Pacific Rim
 Tendo Path from anime Naruto
 Yosuke Tendo from 2020 game Yakuza: Like A Dragon

Other
 Tendo (天道 "Way of Heaven"), a religion in Japan.
 Tendo, Latin term for tendon

See also
 Tendo-ryu (disambiguation)
 Tentō (disambiguation)
 Tend (disambiguation)
 Tiandao (disambiguation), Chinese cognate of